Trigonelline is an alkaloid with chemical formula . It is a zwitterion formed by the methylation of the nitrogen atom of niacin (vitamin B3). Trigonelline is a product of niacin metabolism that is excreted in urine of mammals.

Trigonelline occurs in many plants. It has been isolated from the Japanese radish (Raphanus sativus cv. Sakurajima Daikon), fenugreek seeds (Trigonella foenum-graecum, hence the name), garden peas, hemp seed, oats, potatoes, Stachys species, dahlia, Strophanthus species, and Dichapetalum cymosum.  Trigonelline is also found in coffee. Higher levels of trigonelline are found in arabica coffee.

Holtz, Kutscher, and Theilmann have recorded its presence in a number of animals.

Chemistry  
Trigonelline crystallizes as a monohydrate from alcohol in hygroscopic prisms (m.p. 130 °C or 218 °C [dry, dec.]). It is readily soluble in water or warm alcohol, less so in cold alcohol, and slightly so in chloroform or ether. The salts crystallize well, the monohydrochloride, in leaflets, sparingly soluble in dry alcohol. The picrate forms shining prisms (m.p. 198−200 °C) soluble in water but sparingly soluble in dry alcohol or ether. The alkaloid forms several aurichlorides: the normal salt, B•HCl•AuCl3, is precipitated when excess of gold chloride is added to the hydrochloride, and, after crystallization from dilute hydrochloric acid containing some gold chloride, has m.p. 198 °C. Crystallized from water or very dilute hydrochloric acid, slender needles of B4•3 HAuCl4 (m.p. 186 °C) are obtained.

When trigonelline is heated in closed tubes with barium hydroxide at 120 °C, it gives rise to methylamine, and, if treated similarly with hydrochloric acid at 260 °C creates chloromethane and nicotinic acid (a form of vitamin B3). Trigonelline is a methyl betaine of nicotinic acid.

References

Alkaloids
Quaternary ammonium compounds
Nicotinates
Coffee chemistry
Zwitterions